Tore Edman (July 25, 1904 – June 16, 1995) was a Swedish ski jumper who competed in the 1920s. He won a gold medal in the individual large hill at the 1927 FIS Nordic World Ski Championships in Cortina d'Ampezzo. He was born in Arvika.

External links

1904 births
1995 deaths
Swedish male ski jumpers
FIS Nordic World Ski Championships medalists in ski jumping
Sportspeople from Värmland County